Richard Street is a station on the Hudson–Bergen Light Rail (HBLR) located in the Greenville section of Jersey City, Hudson County, New Jersey. Located at the end of Richard Street next to the northeast end of Bayside Park, the station services local trains of the Hudson–Bergen Light Rail between 8th Street station in Bayonne and Hoboken Terminal. The station contains a single island platform and two tracks. The station is accessible for handicapped persons as part of the Americans with Disabilities Act of 1990, with ramps and platform level matching with trains. The station opened on April 15, 2000 as part of the original operating segment of the Hudson–Bergen Light Rail.

History

Jersey Central station
Richard Street station was built north of the site of a former Central Railroad of New Jersey station in the same area. Located at what is now the south end of Bayside Park, Van Nostrand Place station was a stop on the Main Line in Jersey City. The station agent at Van Nostrand Place was eliminated in 1952 and in June 1958, they razed the single story depot, replacing it with two shelters (one in each direction). Passenger service to Van Nostrand Place ended on April 30, 1967, when the Aldene Plan went into effect, moving CNJ commuter services through Newark Penn Station via the Lehigh Valley Railroad. Service through Bayonne and Jersey City was truncated from Communipaw Terminal to East 33rd Street.

HBLR station
The station opened on April 15, 2000. It is located along the former Central Railroad of New Jersey right of way, which terminated at Communipaw Terminal. During excavations for its construction, workers came across what appear to be the petrified remains of luggage, which were also found at nearby Danforth Avenue stop.

On August 1, 2010, gunfire erupted at the station, sending a group of people running for cover as they were chased by a gunman on the platform. Police arrived at 10:32pm (EST). The gunman and the group were gone, but police recovered three spent bullet casings at the scene, and one bullet projectile at the base of the steps leading to the platform. One of the railings of the steps was struck by one of the bullets. A witness who had been walking about 50 feet behind the group on the platform stated he saw another man run past him and fire three or four shots into the group. No one was shot or injured. The gunman, was described as being in his late teens, 5-foot-8, wearing blue jeans and a black T-shirt.

Station layout

Bibliography

References

External links
Richard Street Light Rail Station – NJ Transit

Hudson-Bergen Light Rail stations
Transportation in Jersey City, New Jersey
Railway stations in the United States opened in 2000
2000 establishments in New Jersey